The Döderhultarn Museum is a museum in Oskarshamn, Sweden that exhibits the carved works of Axel Petersson Döderhultarn.

General information
Axel Petersson "Döderhultarn" (1868–1925) was a Swedish woodcarver. In the Döderhultarn Museum there is a collection of his work, with more than 200 wooden sculptures. The museum is located to the same building as the library in the central parts of Swedish town Oskarshamn.

Gallery

See also
 List of single-artist museums

References

External links
Döderhultarn website

Other sources
Refsal, Harley   (2015) Carving Flat-Plane Style Caricatures (Fox Chapel Publishing)  
Refsal, Harley (2015) Scandinavian Figure Carving (Fox Chapel Publishing)  
Refsal, Harley  (2004) Art & Technique of Scandinavian-Style Woodcarving (Fox Chapel Publishing) 

Oskarshamn
Biographical museums in Sweden
Museums in Kalmar County
Art museums and galleries in Sweden
Folk art museums and galleries
Tourist attractions in Kalmar County
Sculpture galleries in Sweden
Doderhultarn